This is a list of captains and coaches of Australian Football League premiership teams. Jock McHale has coached the most premierships, with eight in total. Syd Coventry, Dick Reynolds and Michael Tuck are the most successful captains, with four premierships each.

The coach of the premiership winning team currently receives the Jock McHale Medal, named in McHale's honour. The medal was first awarded in 2001, and Jock McHale Medals were retrospectively awarded to all premiership winning coaches from 1950 onwards, which was the first season following McHale's retirement from coaching.

List

All team captains prior to 1902, and occasionally until 1922, also acted as the team's coach.

Footnotes
1: Jock McHale had coached the Collingwood throughout that year and into the week of the grand final, but was absent on the day of the grand final, having fallen ill with influenza. Club treasurer Bob Rush performed the match day coaching duties in his place. For many years, Rush was credited with having coached the game, but after a decision in 2014 by the AFL's historians, McHale was credited as Collingwood's sole coach in the game for the purposes of coaching statistics.

Further reading

See also

List of AFL Women's premiership captains and coaches
List of NSWRL/ARL/SL/NRL premiership captains and coaches

References

External links

Australian rules football records and statistics
Premiership captains and coaches
VFL/AFL players
Premiership captains and coaches
Australian sports coaching awards